Basketball at the 1952 Summer Olympics was the third appearance of the sport of basketball as an official Olympic medal event.  23 nations entered the competition.

The top six teams at the 1948 Summer Olympics qualified automatically, as did the winners of the 1950 FIBA World Championship (Argentina), the top two teams at the 1951 EuroBasket (USSR and Czechoslovakia), and the host country (Finland).  Thirteen other nations competed in a preliminary round to determine the last six places in the sixteen-team Olympic tournament.

Medalists

Results

Preliminary round
Nations that lost two games in the preliminary tournaments were eliminated.  When there were only two teams left in each group, those teams advanced to the main tournament.

Group A

First round
 Cuba def. Belgium, 59–51
 Bulgaria def. Switzerland, 69–58

Second round
Bulgaria's victory earned it a berth in the main tournament, while Switzerland's second loss eliminated them.

 Bulgaria def. Cuba, 62–56
 Belgium def. Switzerland, 59–49

Final Round
The two teams that were 1–1 played each other: the winner received a tournament berth and the loser was eliminated.

 Cuba def. Belgium, 71–63

Group B

First round
 Hungary def. Greece, 75–38
 Philippines def. Israel, 57–47

Second round
The Philippines qualified for the main tournament, while Israel's second loss eliminated them.

 Philippines def. Hungary, 48–35
 Greece def. Israel, 54–52

Final round
The two teams that were 1–1 played each, with the winner receiving a tournament berth and the loser being eliminated.

 Hungary def. Greece, 47–44

Group C

First round
 Canada def. Italy, 68–57
 Egypt def. Turkey, 64–45
Bye: Romania

Second round
Romania's first game was a loss to Canada.  Italy and Turkey played each other, with Turkey's second loss eliminating them.

 Canada def. Romania, 72–51
 Italy def. Turkey, 49–37
Bye: Egypt

Third round
Italy and Romania, who had both lost once, played each other.  Romania's second loss eliminated them, while Canada and Egypt played each other, with Egypt being served its first loss; Canada qualified.

 Italy def. Romania, 53–39
 Canada def. Egypt, 63–57

Final round
Italy played its fourth game of the tournament against Egypt.  The closely contested decisive game ended with Egypt qualifying for the main competition and Italy being eliminated.

 Egypt def. Italy, 66–62

Main tournament

First round
The top two teams in each group advanced to the quarterfinal round.

Group A

Group B

Group C

Group D

Quarterfinals
The top two teams in each quarterfinals advanced to the semifinals.  The other two teams in each quarterfinals played in the fifth through eighth place classification.

Quarterfinals group A

Quarterfinals group B

Knockout rounds

Brackets

Semifinals 
 Classification 5–8 semifinals

 Medal round semifinals

Finals 
 7th place final

 5th place final

 Bronze medal game

 Gold medal game

Awards

Participating nations
For the team rosters see: Basketball at the 1952 Summer Olympics – Men's team rosters.

Each country was allowed to enter one team of 14 players and they all were eligible for participation. A total number of 317 players were entered.

A total of 301(*) basketball players from 23 nations competed at the Helsinki Games:

 
 
 
 
 
 
 
 
 
 
 
 
 
 
 
 
 
 
 
 
 
 
 

(*) NOTE: There are only players counted, which participated in one game at least. Up to now only two reserve player can be named, 14 reserve players are unknown.

Team rosters

References

External links
 Official Olympic Report

 
Basketball
1952
1952 in basketball
International basketball competitions hosted by Finland